M.J. Rosenberg was formerly a Senior Foreign Policy Fellow at Media Matters Action Network. Prior to this, he worked on Capitol Hill for 15 years for various Democratic members of the House and Senate.

Rosenberg was also a Clinton political appointee at USAID. In the early 1980s, he was the editor of the American Israel Public Affairs Committee's weekly newsletter Near East Report. During 1998–2009, he was director of policy at Israel Policy Forum.

During 2009–2012, he worked for Media Matters for America, a position he left after a confrontation with Alan Dershowitz, who objected to Rosenberg's use of the term "Israel Firster," and threatened to embarrass MMFA if Rosenberg remained at the Democratic-affiliated organization.

References

External links
Huffington Post Archive

Year of birth missing (living people)
Living people
American editors
People of the United States Agency for International Development
American Jews